Nbusiyu David Opara (born 14 December 1985) is a Nigerian football player, who plays for Laxmi Prasad S.C. in the Goa Professional League.

References

External links
 goal.com
 

1985 births
Living people
Nigerian footballers
Nigerian expatriate footballers
Nigerian expatriate sportspeople in India
Expatriate footballers in India
I-League players
Churchill Brothers FC Goa players
Air India FC players
ONGC FC players
Mumbai FC players
Association football forwards